Dr. Alan Gelperin is a scientist and biologist currently at Princeton University. He is an emeritus faculty member at Monell Chemical Senses Center. He specializes in electronic olfaction and computational neuroscience. He received his bachelor's degree in biology from Carleton College in 1962 and went on to get a Ph.D. from University of Pennsylvania.

He is most notable for his efforts in creating robots with electronic noses which can localize odors, and for the invention of a supermarket fruit and vegetable scanner that does not use barcodes but instead scans by scent.

References

External links
Dr. Gelperin's publications
Dr. Gelperin's homepage

Living people
21st-century American biologists
Year of birth missing (living people)